Danforth is a census-designated place (CDP) and the primary village in the town of Danforth, Washington County, Maine, United States. It is in northernmost Washington County, in the northern part of the town of Danforth, and is bordered to the north by the town of Weston in Aroostook County. The village is located on Baskahegan Stream where it originates at the outlet of Crooked Brook Flowage. The Baskahegan is a northwest-flowing tributary of the Mattawamkeag River and part of the Penobscot River watershed.

U.S. Route 1 passes through the east side of the village, leading north  to Houlton and southeast  to Calais. State Route 169 runs southwest from Danforth  to State Route 6 in Springfield.

Danforth was first listed as a CDP prior to the 2020 census.

Demographics

References 

Census-designated places in Washington County, Maine
Census-designated places in Maine